L.A. Turnaround is the ninth album by Scottish folk musician Bert Jansch, released in 1974.

Background
After the demise of Pentangle, Jansch recorded the album in Tony Stratton-Smith's home in Crowborough, Sussex and in a studio in California. It was produced by Michael Nesmith with the exception of two of the tracks ("Chambertin" and former bandmate John Renbourn’s "Lady Nothing") which were recorded in Paris a year earlier. A short film was produced during the sessions in Sussex.

Other guest musicians include Klaus Voormann (bass guitar), Red Rhodes (pedal steel guitar), Byron Berline (fiddle, mandolin) and Jesse Ed Davis (guitar).

Reception

In his review for Allmusic, critic Thom Jurek wrote of the album, "The album was hailed at the time as an exemplary work, and its reputation certainly holds in the 21st century... the set walks through a lush garden that stands between the traditional English folk that Jansch had mastered and a sort of easy-breathing country-rock. Simply put, this is one of Jansch’s masterpieces, and a singular type of album in his long and storied career."

Track listing
All tracks composed by Bert Jansch; except where indicated

"Fresh as a Sweet Sunday Morning" – 3:57
"Chambertin" – 4:04
"One for Jo" – 2:28
"Travelling Man" – 2:47
"Open Up the Watergate (Let the Sunshine In)" – 2:40
"Stone Monkey" – 3:10
"Of Love and Lullaby" – 2:28
"Needle of Death" – 3:24
"Lady Nothing" (John Renbourn) – 2:32
"There Comes a Time" – 2:38
"Cluck Old Hen" (Traditional; arranged by Bert Jansch) – 3:10
"The Blacksmith" (lyrics: Jansch; music: Doc Watson) – 3:30

2009 Remaster
Same as the original LP release, with the following bonus tracks:

"Open Up the Watergate" (Alternate Version) – 3:38
"One for Jo" (Alternate Version) – 3:10
"The Blacksmith" (Alternate Version) – 3:39
"In the Bleak Midwinter" (Christina Rossetti, Gustav Holst; arranged by Bert Jansch) – 2:25

Personnel
Bert Jansch - guitar, piano, vocals
Michael Nesmith - guitar
Red Rhodes - steel guitar
Byron Berline - fiddle, mandolin on "Cluck Old Hen"
Klaus Voormann - bass
Danny Lane - drums
Jesse Ed Davis - guitar on "Open Up the Watergate" 
Jay Lacy - guitar on "Of Love and Lullaby"
Michael Cohen - electric piano on "The Blacksmith"

Production
Producer: Michael Nesmith, Danny Thompson
Recording engineer: Jean-Louis, Ron Nevison, Bill Drescher
Art Direction: Frank Sansom
Photography: Mike Van Der Vord

References

Bert Jansch albums
1974 albums
Charisma Records albums
Albums produced by Michael Nesmith